Trail ethics define appropriate ranges of behavior for hikers on a public trail.  It is similar to both environmental ethics and human rights in that it deals with the shared interaction of humans and nature.  There are multiple agencies and groups that support and encourage ethical behavior on trails.

Trail ethics applies to the use of trails, by pedestrians, dog walkers, hikers, backpackers, mountain bikers, equestrians, hunters, and off-road vehicles.

Etiquette 

Sometimes conflicts can develop between different types of users of a trail or pathway. Etiquette has developed to minimize such interference. Examples include:
 When two groups meet on a steep trail, a custom has developed in some areas whereby the group moving uphill has the right-of-way.
 Trail users generally avoid making loud sounds, such as shouting or loud conversation, playing music, or the use of mobile phones.
 Trail users tend to avoid impacting on the land through which they travel. Users can avoid impact by staying on established trails, and durable surfaces, not picking plants, or disturbing wildlife, and carrying garbage out. The Leave No Trace movement offers a set of guidelines for low-impact hiking: "Leave nothing but footprints. Take nothing but photos. Kill nothing but time. Keep nothing but memories".
 The feeding of wild animals is dangerous and can cause harm to both the animals and to other people.
 Mountain bikers must yield to both hikers and riders on horses (equestrians), unless the trail is clearly designated and marked for bike-only travel. Hikers yield to equestrians.

Trails in urban areas 

Some cities have worked to add pathways for pedestrians and cyclists. This can reduce the amount of vehicle traffic in busy urban areas, and make visiting downtown areas more pleasant, There can be difficulties when a path is used by people travelling at different speeds, such as pedestrians, joggers, and cyclists, and the appropriate etiquette is not observed.

Off road vehicles
In the US off-road vehicle use on public land has been criticized by some members of the government and environmental organizations including the Sierra Club and The Wilderness Society. They have noted several consequences of illegal ORV use such as pollution, trail damage, erosion, land degradation, possible species extinction, and habitat destruction which can leave hiking trails impassable. ORV proponents argue that legal use taking place under planned access along with the multiple environment and trail conservation efforts by ORV groups will mitigate these issues. Groups such as the Blueribbon Coalition advocate Treadlightly, which is the responsible use of public lands used for off-road activities.

See also

 Tread Lightly!
 Leave No Trace
 "Rules of the Trail" (as applied in Mountain biking)
 Clean Trails
 Conservation ethic
 Environmental ethics

References

External links
 Clean Trails
 Trail Ethics - Ontario-based Codes
 Trail ethics are provided by: Leave No Trace, Inc.
 Trail Etiquette in the Age of Me

Environmental ethics
Trails